USCGC Ingham may refer to the following ships of the United States Coast Guard:

, originally Samuel D. Ingham, a preserved Treasury-class cutter
, a Heritage-class cutter currently contracted for construction

See also 
 USRC Ingham, ships with the same name which saw service with the US Revenue Cutter Service

United States Coast Guard ship names